A context model (or context modeling) defines how context data are structured and maintained (It plays a key role in supporting efficient context management). It aims to produce a formal or semi-formal description of the context information that is present in a context-aware system. In other words, the context is the surrounding element for the system, and a model provides the mathematical interface and a behavioral description of the surrounding environment.

It is used to represent the reusable context information of the components (The top level classes consist of Operating system, component container, hardware requirement and Software requirement).

A key role of context model is to simplify and introduce greater structure into the task of developing context-aware applications.

Examples of context models

The Unified Modeling Language as used in systems engineering defines a context model as the physical scope of the system being designed, which could include the user as well as the environment and other actors. A system context diagram represents the context graphically..

Several examples of context models occur under other domains.

 In the situation of parsing a grammar, a context model defines the surrounding text of a lexical element. This enables a context sensitive grammar that can have deterministic or stochastic rules. In the latter case, a hidden Markov model can provide the probabilities for the surrounding context.
 A context model can also apply to the surrounding elements in a gene sequence. Like the context rules of a grammar disambiguating a lexical element, this helps to disambiguate the role of the gene.
 Within an ontology, a context model provides disambiguation of a subject via semantic analysis of information related to the subject.
 In terms of a physical environment, a context model defines the external interfaces that a system will interact with. This type of context model has been used to create models for virtual environments such as the Adaptive Vehicle Make program.  A context model used during design defines land, aquatic, or atmospheric characteristics (stated in terms of mathematical algorithms or a simulation) that the eventual product will face in the real environment.

References 

Systems analysis